Laurie Etheridge (born 12 September 1948 in Pulborough, England) is a former motorcycle speedway rider in National League (speedway).

His first attempt at speedway, in 1963, was thwarted when his bike was stolen and he did not resume the sport until 1966.

In 1967, he signed for Exeter Falcons and managed three appearances for them in that season.
His career really started the following year, when he was signed up for Hackney Hawks by Len Silver and their partner team Rayleigh Rockets. A good season for Rayleigh resulted in a full-time contract for Hackney.

He was a Crayford regular for 8 years, achieving nearly 300 league and cup appearances as a Kestrel. Crayford held a Testimonial Season for Etheridge in 1982,

Notable performances:
England v Russia (1974)
National League Riders Champion (1975)
National League series GB v Denmark (1978) - there was also a series against Australia
National League Four Team Tournament (1980)
Testimonial Year Crayford Kestrels v England (1982)

In the 1975 National League Riders Championship at Wimbledon, the final race was between him and Brian Collins (speedway rider) where Collins came off in the first lap and Etheridge rode a solitary four laps to be crowned champion.

Etheridge was in the side when Crayford won their only trophy, the 1980 National League Four-Team Championship, however due to machine troubles he didn't start a race in the final of the tournament.

His last race was at Newcastle for Canterbury in 1983.

Post-speedway, he worked in Industrial Plumbing and Central Heating.
He lives in West Sussex with his wife, Denise, and they have two married daughters and four grandchildren.

References

External links
 http://www.speedwayatoz.co.uk/laurieetheridge.html|season records
 http://wwosbackup.proboards.com/thread/494|teams and meetings
 http://www.crayfordkestrels.co.uk/?page_id=10
 http://hackneyreunion.com/Hackney-team-riders-1935-1996|names of riders 1935-1996

1948 births
English motorcycle racers
British speedway riders
Exeter Falcons riders
Rayleigh Rockets riders
Canterbury Crusaders riders
Crayford Kestrels riders
Hackney Hawks riders
Sheffield Tigers riders
Coventry Bees riders
Living people